Kiulu is a state constituency in Sabah, Malaysia, that has been represented in the Sabah State Legislative Assembly. It is mandated to return a single member to the Assembly under the first-past-the-post voting system.

Polling districts 
As at 12 February 2016, this constituency contains the polling districts of Kilang Bata, Telibong, Rangalau, Kiulu, Malangang, Togop, Kelawat, Bongol, Simpangan, Taginambur, Pukak, Mantob, Pahu, Tiong Simpodon, Poring, Tomis and Tudan.

History

Election results

References 

Sabah state constituencies